Baruch Alberto Barrera Zurita (born 24 August 1973 in Veracruz, Veracruz) is a Mexican politician affiliated with the Institutional Revolutionary Party (formerly to the National Action Party). As of 2014 he served as Deputy of the LIX Legislature of the Mexican Congress as a plurinominal representative.

References

1973 births
Living people
People from Veracruz (city)
Politicians from Veracruz
Members of the Chamber of Deputies (Mexico)
Institutional Revolutionary Party politicians
National Action Party (Mexico) politicians
Monterrey Institute of Technology and Higher Education alumni
Deputies of the LIX Legislature of Mexico